The Almaguin Spartans are a Canadian junior ice hockey team based in South River, Ontario.  They play in the Greater Metro Junior A Hockey League (GMHL).  They were originally the Mattawa Voyageurs of Mattawa, Ontario.

History
The Voyageurs were announced as a team in spring 2011. On September 16, 2011, the team played its first game, at home, against the Bobcaygeon Bucks. The Voyageurs lost the game in a shootout 5–4. On September 18, at home again, the Voyageurs picked up their first win, 5–4 in overtime over the Algoma Avalanche.

In July 2014, the team was approved for relocation to South River, Ontario, where they became the Almaguin Spartans.

In March 2015, Myles Pepin was promoted from assistant coach and was named the team's new head coach.

During the 2018 playoffs, the Spartans swept their first three playoff series with nine straight wins before losing two games to the St. George Ravens in the final series. The Spartans then claimed their first Russell Cup championship over the Ravens in six games.

For the 2019–20 season, Andre Laperriere was named the head coach when Pepin stepped aside for an advisory role to spend more time with family.

Season-by-season records

Playoffs
2012
Orangeville Americans defeated Mattawa Voyageurs 2-games-to-none in bye round
2013
Temiscaming Titans defeated Mattawa Voyageurs 3-games-to-none in division quarter-finals
2014
South Muskoka Shield defeated Mattawa Voyageurs 3-games-to-none in division quarter-finals
2015
Sturgeon Falls Lumberjacks defeated Almaguin Spartans 5–4 (OT) in the North Division Elimination Qualifier Game
2016
Almaguin Spartans defeated Bracebridge Blues 3-games-to-1 in division quarter-finals
Almaguin Spartans defeated Temiscaming Titans 3-games-to-1 in division semi-finals
Almaguin Spartans defeated South Muskoka Shield 4-games-to-2 in division finals
Almaguin Spartans 1–3 in Russell Cup Round Robin (Lost 1–4 vs. Steam, Lost 1–5 vs. Kings, Lost 1–7 vs. Kings, Won 4–3 vs. Steam)
Tottenham Steam defeated Almaguin Spartans 7–2 in the Russell Cup Championship play-in game.
2017
South Muskoka Shield defeated Almaguin Spartans 3-games-to-2 in division quarter-finals
2018
Almaguin Spartans defeated South Muskoka Shield 2-games-to-none in division quarter-finals
Almaguin Spartans defeated Temiscaming Titans 3-games-to-none in division semi-finals
Almaguin Spartans defeated Bradford Rattlers 4-games-to-none in division finals
Almaguin Spartans defeated St. George Ravens 4-games-to-2 in Russell Cup finals
2019
New Tecumseth Civics defeated Almaguin Spartans 2-games-to-1 in division quarter-finals
2020
Almaguin Spartans defeated Ville-Marie Pirates 2-games-to-1 in division quarter-finals
Temiscaming Titans defeated Almaguin Spartans 3-games-to-none in division semi-finals

References

External links
Team Webpage
GMHL Webpage

2011 establishments in Ontario
Ice hockey clubs established in 2011
Ice hockey teams in Ontario